Notre Dame of Abuyog is a private Catholic school run by the Oblates of Notre Dame (OND).in Abuyog, Leyte, Philippines The School is a member of Notre Dame Educational Association, a gathering of Notre Dame Schools in the Philippines.

References

External links 
 http://www.philippinecompanies.com/companyprofile/51160/notre-dame-of-abuyog
 http://www.abuyogleyte.com/photogallery/details.php?image_id=655
 http://www.mapiles.com/notre-dame-of-abuyog/
 http://claretianpublications.com/index.php/religious-women/318-ond-oblates-of-notre-dame-e-1956

Schools in Leyte (province)
Catholic universities and colleges in the Philippines
Oblate schools in the Philippines
Notre Dame Educational Association
Abuyog